The Winnipeg Blue Bombers played in their third consecutive Grey Cup final. A last-second rouge gave Winnipeg its second title in five years.

Regular season, final standings
Column headings: GP = Games played, W = Wins, L = Losses, T = Ties, PF = Points for, PA = Points against, Pts = Points

Bold text means that they have clinched the playoffs

BCRFU playoffs
Note: All dates in 1939

BCRFU semifinals
University of British Columbia Thunderbirds advance to BCRFU finals
Victoria Revellers advance to BCRFU finals

BCRFU final
University of British Columbia Thunderbirds win the BCRFU championship

Grey Cup playoffs
Note: All dates in 1939

Semifinals

Sarnia won the total-point series by 31–14 and played the Ottawa Rough Riders (IRFU Champions) in the Eastern Finals.

Ottawa won the total-point series by 39–6 and played the Sarnia Imperials (ORFU Champions) in the Eastern Finals.

Finals

Winnipeg won the total-point series by 35–20 and advanced to the Grey Cup game.

Ottawa advanced to the Grey Cup game.

Playoff bracket

Grey Cup Championship

1939 Interprovincial Rugby Football Union All-Stars
NOTE: During this time most players played both ways, so the All-Star selections do not distinguish between some offensive and defensive positions.
QB – Bill Stukus, Toronto Argonauts
FW – Bill Davies, Montreal Royals
HB – Red Storey, Toronto Argonauts
HB – Bill Isbister, Hamilton Tigers
FB – Tony Golab, Ottawa Rough Riders
E  – Tony McCarthy, Ottawa Rough Riders
E  – Bernie Thornton, Toronto Argonauts
C  – George Willis, Toronto Argonauts
G – Charles "Tiny" Hermann, Ottawa Rough Riders
G – Len Staughton, Ottawa Rough Riders
T – Bunny Wadsworth, Ottawa Rough Riders
T – Dave Sprague, Ottawa Rough Riders

1939 Ontario Rugby Football Union All-Stars
NOTE: During this time most players played both ways, so the All-Star selections do not distinguish between some offensive and defensive positions.
QB – Clayton "Curly" Krug, Peterborough Orfuns
FW – Joe Woodcock, Sarnia Imperials
HB – Bernie Moroz, Sarnia Imperials
HB – Eddie Thompson, Toronto Balmy Beach Beachers
DB – Johnny Ferraro, Montreal Westmounts
E  – Ike Norris, Sarnia Imperials
E  – Leo Deadey, Peterborough Orfuns
C  – Harry Living, Sarnia Imperials
G – Bob Reid, Toronto Balmy Beach Beachers
G – Pat Bulter, Sarnia Imperials
T – Cliff Parsons, Sarnia Imperials
T – Tommy Burns, Montreal Westmounts

1939 Canadian Football Awards
 Jeff Russel Memorial Trophy (IRFU MVP) – Bill Davies (FW), Montreal Royals
 Imperial Oil Trophy (ORFU MVP) - Eddie Thompson - Toronto Balmy Beach Beachers

References

 
Canadian Football League seasons
Grey Cups hosted in Ottawa